The second cabinet of Recep Tayyip Erdogan was the cabinet of the government of Turkey from 29 August 2007 to 14 June 2011. It followed the first cabinet of Erdoğan. It laid down its function after the formation of the Cabinet Erdoğan III, which was formed following the 2011 elections.

 Nonpartisan minister appointed in accordance with the Article 114 of the constitution in the wake of 2011 elections

See also 

 Cabinet of Turkey

Cabinet II
Erdogan II
Justice and Development Party (Turkey)
2007 establishments in Turkey
2011 disestablishments in Turkey
Cabinets established in 2007
Cabinets disestablished in 2011